Phosphocarrier HPr protein is a small cytoplasmic protein that is a component of the phosphoenolpyruvate-dependent sugar phosphotransferase system (PTS).

The phosphoenolpyruvate-dependent sugar phosphotransferase system (PTS) is a major carbohydrate transport system in bacteria. The PTS catalyses the phosphorylation of sugar substrates during their translocation across the cell membrane. The mechanism involves the transfer of a phosphoryl group from phosphoenolpyruvate (PEP) via enzyme I (EI) to enzyme II (EII) of the PTS system, which in turn transfers it to a phosphocarrier protein (HPr). In some bacteria HPr is a domain in a larger protein that includes an EIII(Fru) (IIA) domain and in some cases also an EI domain.

There is a conserved histidine in the N-terminus of HPr, which serves as an acceptor for the phosphoryl group of EI. In the central part of HPr there is a conserved serine which, in Gram-positive bacteria only, is phosphorylated by
an ATP-dependent protein kinase, a process which probably plays a regulatory role in sugar transport.

References

Protein families